Crivadiatherium is an extinct genus of Palaeoamasiidae, which fossil remains—teeth and mandible fragments—have been discovered in the Crivadia site in the Hațeg depression, Romania. The age of the Crivadia site is not clear, but seems to be between the Late Eocene to the Early Oligocene. The teeth of Crivadiatherium, compared with those of its relatives as Palaeoamasia from Turkey and Arsinoitherium from Egypt, shows features more primitive, with lower molars without lobes and less bilophodont. It is probable that Crivadiatherium lived in lacustrine environments, maybe eating abrasive plants.

References

Embrithopods
Prehistoric placental genera
Fossil taxa described in 1976
Oligocene mammals of Europe